Helen Kleinbort Krauze (born in Białystok) is a Polish-born Mexican Jewish journalist who worked for over five decades as an interviewer, features and travel writer and columnist. She was first with Novedades, later with El Heraldo de México and more recently with Sol de Mexico and Protocolo magazine.

Biographical
Helen Krauze arrived in Veracruz, Veracruz, Mexico, when she was a small child with her Jewish-immigrant parents, José Kleinbort and Eugenia Firman, via Santander, Spain to seek refuge from the German invasion of Poland, the Holocaust, and the war persecution of Jews elsewhere. She attended Maddox Academy, a bilingual Spanish-English school, and later earned a degree in English literature from the University of Cambridge.

She lives in Mexico City, and is the mother of one daughter and two sons, including Enrique Krauze, a Mexican historian and writer.

Career
Before she was a journalist, Krauze wrote newsletters during the 1950s.

Helen Krauze began her journalism career in 1959 when she was hired by Daniel Dueñas at the Novedades newspaper to conduct interviews. She became known for her interviews first at Novedades and then later at El Heraldo de México and El Sol de México. She published around 900 interviews during her career, including interviews with Carlos Monsivais, Sarita Montiel, Josephine Baker, Spanish actor Manolo Fabregas, Mexican author Hugo Argüelles (Los Cuervos están de luto), Elena Poniatowska, Emilio Portes Gil, Teddy Stauffer, and Pedro Friedeberg. She was a journalist for Novedades until 1989 when she was hired by El Heraldo de México (known later as the Diario Monitor), and she became known later for her column La Semana con Helen Krauze. She also contributed to Protocolo, Kena, Actual, Claudia and Siempre.

In order to support her family she supplemented her income by doing costume work for a few of Tulio Demicheli's films, such as Novia, esposa y amante (1981), and TV host for La hora de los locutores.

Affiliations
On 4 October 1967 she became part of the group of journalists Veinte Mujeres y un Hombre ("Twenty Women and a Man"). This group, founded by Hylda Pino de Sandoval, encouraged women to be educated and work in the journalism profession. She is also a member and vice president of Asociación Mundial de Mujeres Periodistas y Escritoras ("World Association of Women Journalists and Writers"). She is also member of the Asociación Mexicana de Prensa Turística (Ampretur) ("Mexican Association of Tourism Press"), founded in 1975 by Agustín Salmón Esparza.

Awards
Over a career that spanned fifty years, Krauze was presented with several prestigious awards for her contributions to Mexican journalism:
 1967, Premio de los Voceadores de México
 1989, Medalla Magdalena Mondragón (25th year of journalism)
 2009, Premio Club Primera Plana (50th year of journalism)
 2009 Award for excellence in tourism journalism at the award's premier presented by Ampretur, the Mexican Association of Tourist Press
 2012 Doña Cuca Massieu Medal presented by the Asociación de Mujeres de Prensa in Guerrero (AMPG)

Books
 Viajera que Vas (1998).
 Pláticas en el tiempo (2011).

References

Year of birth missing (living people)
Living people
Alumni of the University of Cambridge
Mexican women writers
Mexican Jews
Mexican people of Polish-Jewish descent
Mexican women journalists
People from Białystok
Polish emigrants to Mexico